Fortuna Stadium is a multi-use stadium in Covaci, Timiș County. It is the home ground of Fortuna Covaci. It holds 1,500 people all on seats.

Football venues in Romania
Buildings and structures in Timiș County